The Crazy Making Tour was a 2009 summer tour which featured the alternative rock bands Switchfoot and Blue October co-headlining. The tour was first announced on Blue October's Myspace profile and Switchfoot's Twitter feed.  Supporting acts for the tour were Longwave and Ours. Each band's set varied by location. Some shows had one playing significantly longer, but others had the time split equally.

Itinerary
The tour dates were first announced May 28 on both band's respective websites and profiles.

The tour spanned two months in the summer, and began in Council Bluffs, Iowa, and concluded in Hampton Beach, New Hampshire. The sizes of the shows varied, with the bands mostly playing in mid-sized to large auditoriums, theaters, and rock clubs.

Tickets
Pre-sale for the shows began on June 1, available exclusively to Switchfoot and Blue October fans. Sales to the general public went live June 5. Prices were relatively affordable, with general admissions tickets going for an average of $33 each.

Tour dates

References

Switchfoot concert tours
2009 concert tours
Christian concert tours
Co-headlining concert tours